Karolína Plíšková was the defending champion, but lost in the semifinals to Garbiñe Muguruza.

Muguruza went on to win the title, defeating Simona Halep in the final, 6–1, 6–0. By losing the final, Halep failed to take advantage of her third opportunity in 2017 to take over the WTA No. 1 singles ranking when the top ranking was only one more match win away.

Seeds
The top eight seeds received a bye into the second round.

Draw

Finals

Top half

Section 1

Section 2

Bottom half

Section 3

Section 4

Qualifying

Seeds

Qualifiers

Lucky losers
  Natalia Vikhlyantseva

Draw

First qualifier

Second qualifier

Third qualifier

Fourth qualifier

Fifth qualifier

Sixth qualifier

Seventh qualifier

Eighth qualifier

Ninth qualifier

Tenth qualifier

Eleventh qualifier

Twelfth qualifier

References
Main Draw
Qualifying Draw

Women's Singles